The Rivière à l'Épaule (English: Shoulder river) is a tributary of the Jacques-Cartier River, flowing in the administrative region of Capitale-Nationale, in Quebec, Canada. The course of the river crosses the unorganized territory of Lac-Jacques-Cartier in the La Côte-de-Beaupré Regional County Municipality, as well as the township municipality unis de Stoneham-et-Tewkesbury, located in the MRC La Jacques-Cartier Regional County Municipality.

The course of the river flows entirely in the Jacques-Cartier National Park (at the eastern limit of the park) which is affiliated with the Société des établissements de plein air du Québec (Sépaq).

The Rivière à l'Épaule valley is mainly served on the east side by the route 175 which links the towns of Quebec and Saguenay. Some secondary roads serve this area for forestry and recreational tourism activities.

Forestry is the main economic activity in the sector; recreational tourism, second.

The surface of the Rivière à l'Épaule (except the rapids) is generally frozen from the beginning of December to the end of March; safe circulation on the ice is generally done from the end of December to the beginning of March.

Geography 
The Rivière à l'Épaule originates from Petit lac à l'Épaule (), located in the unorganized territory of Lac-Jacques-Cartier, in the Laurentides Wildlife Reserve (at the eastern limit of Jacques-Cartier National Park), in the MRC of La Côte-de-Beaupré Regional County Municipality. This lake has a marsh area on its north shore. The route 175 passes on the eastern shore of this lake. The Roger-Gosselin and Gar-Porter mountains are located on the east side of this small head lake.

The Rivière à l'Épaule flows onto the east bank of the Jacques-Cartier River, at the foot of the Montagne de l'Épaule. From this confluence, the current descends the Jacques-Cartier River for  generally south to the northeast bank of the St. Lawrence River.

Toponymy 
The origin of this toponym is very old. Its meaning remains uncertain, however, the main hypothesis considered describes that the shoulder (shoulder) could here designate a flat with a fairly gentle slope used to connect two valleys whose level differs. The phenomenon is common in regions that have experienced glaciations.

A report dated 1829 and signed by the surveyor John Adams mentions the L'Épaule River and the Montagne de l'Épaule, while William Ware describes the surroundings of Lac Épaule in 1835. This area was frequented in the 17th century by Jesuits who went, by a path traced by the Innu, to lac Saint-Jean. The plan of the Wendat (Huron) chief Nicholas Vincent, drawn up around 1829, identifies the river under its Wendat name Hüaonjacaronté.

This sector, on the outskirts of the settlers' settlements, has undergone some attempts to clear it, because abattis were spotted there in 1867. The government then built a shelter there for travelers from Lac-Saint-Jean. Later, a road to Jacques-Cartier Lake. Beginning in 1907, sport fishermen were in turn served by accommodation facilities, to which was later added Camp Devlin. Lac à l'Épaule hosted, in the summer of 1943, Sir Winston Churchill and Franklin Delano Roosevelt, gathered in Quebec for an Allied conference. A larger pavilion, erected by a logging company in 1946, later became a meeting place reserved for government officials. A landmark event in contemporary history took place there in September 1962 and made the expression make, hold a shoulder-to-shoulder famous. A special council of ministers of the Quebec government was there, in fact, to decide to call a referendum election on the theme "Give Hydro-Quebec the mandate to unify and integrate Quebec hydroelectric resources".

The toponym "Rivière à l'Épaule" was formalized on December 5, 1968 at the Place Names Bank of the Commission de toponymie du Québec.

See also 

 Laurentides Wildlife Reserve
 Jacques-Cartier National Park
 Montagne de l'Épaule
 Lac-Jacques-Cartier, an unorganized territory
 Stoneham-et-Tewkesbury, a municipality
 La Côte-de-Beaupré Regional County Municipality
 La Jacques-Cartier Regional County Municipality
 Lac à l'Épaule
 Jacques-Cartier River
 List of rivers of Quebec

Notes and references

Bibliography 

.

Rivers of Capitale-Nationale
La Côte-de-Beaupré Regional County Municipality
La Jacques-Cartier Regional County Municipality
Laurentides Wildlife Reserve